George Beare may refer to:
 George Beare (footballer) (1885–1970), English footballer
 George Beare (painter) (died 1749), English painter